American singer-songwriter Clairo has released two studio albums, 14 extended plays (including 13 released independently as Claire Cottrill), 30 singles (including 14 as a featured artist), and seven music videos.

Studio albums

Extended plays

As Claire Cottrill
Do U Wanna Fall in Love? (2014)
Love Songs 4 the Heartbroken (2015)
Sweet (2015)
Have a Nice Day (2015)
Late Show (2015)
Aquarius Boy (2015)
Claire Cottrill (2015)
Metal Heart (2015)
Moth Girl (2015)
Growing (2015)
Creased Laundry (2016)
Brains a Bus Station (2016)
Split with Keel Her (2016)

Singles

As lead artist

As featured artist

Other charted and certified songs

Guest appearances

Music videos

Notes

References

Discographies of American artists